Dogyongsan is a mountain of Gyeongsangbuk-do, eastern South Korea. It has an elevation of 955.5 metres.

See also
List of mountains of Korea

References

Seongju County
Mountains of North Gyeongsang Province
Mountains of South Korea